Jeremy Paul may refer to:
 Jeremy Paul (rugby union), New Zealand-born Australian rugby union player
 Jeremy Paul (screenwriter), British film and television writer
 Jeremy R. Paul, dean of Northeastern University School of Law

See also